Grant Robert Gee (born 24 October 1964) is a British film maker, photographer and cinematographer. He is most noted for his 1998 documentary Meeting People Is Easy about the British alternative rock group Radiohead.

Early life
Gee was born in Plymouth, Devon and studied Geography at St Catherine's College, Oxford. He did postgraduate study at University of Illinois at Urbana–Champaign.

Career
In the early 1990s Gee worked on U2's Zoo TV and Zoo Radio, and collaborated with Mark Neale on several projects (many through London production company Kudos Productions), including "The Memory Palace", an experimental multi-media project combining film and live performance for the Expo '92.

In 1996 he directed a twenty-seven-minute short film commissioned by progressive house band Spooky for parts of their album "Found Sound" (namely the tracks "Central Heating", "Bamboo", "Aphonia", "Lowest Common Denominator", "Hypo-Allergenic"/"Interim"). The film was displayed on a continuous loop outside the Centre Georges Pompidou as part of its re-opening.

Gee followed the band Radiohead whilst they were on tour for their highly acclaimed 1997 album OK Computer. Gee's 1998 documentary of the tour, Meeting People Is Easy, was nominated for a Grammy award for Best Long Form Music Video.

His short films including Tel Aviv City Symphony (commissioned by onedotzero), the documentary JC-03 (about John Cale at work) and the dance film Torsion (choreographed by Russell Maliphant) have been shown internationally as part of touring packages by the British Council, onedotzero and Film and Video Umbrella. Gee has also made music videos for British bands including Radiohead and Blur.

In April 2006 the Creative Commons-licensed film project A Swarm of Angels announced that Gee has joined the project team as Director of Photography. In 2007, he made Western Lands, a ten-minute film about climbing the Old Man of Hoy. In November 2010 Grant received funding from the UK Film Council to develop the project New Career in a New Town: David Bowie in Berlin, a music documentary on David Bowie's Berlin period.

Gee's 2007 documentary, Joy Division, told the story of the eponymous Manchester band and was made in collaboration with writer Jon Savage. The film received generally positive reviews from critics. In Variety, Robert Koehler wrote that the documentary was "emotionally deeper" than the biopic directed by Anton Corbijn, Control.

In January 2011, Gee completed his film Patience: After Sebald based on Sebald's book The Rings of Saturn, which was accepted by the Vancouver International Film Festival and the New York Film Festival. In The Observer, Philip French called it a "modest, immensely enjoyable documentary".

In 2015, Gee's documentary film Innocence of Memories, made in collaboration with Turkish novelist Orhan Pamuk and based on his novel The Museum of Innocence, was screened as a special event in the Venice Days section at the 72nd Venice International Film Festival.

References

External links
 
 Grant Gee  at the Music Video DataBase
 Biography at the site of production company Oil Factory
 Retrospective at Cinecity: The Brighton Film Festival in 2005
 John May interviews Grant Gee

1964 births
Alumni of St Catherine's College, Oxford
British film directors
British music video directors
British documentary filmmakers
Mass media people from Devon
Living people
University of Illinois Urbana-Champaign alumni